Ricardo Álvares Guedes Vaz (born 26 November 1994) is a Portuguese professional footballer who plays as a right winger for Polish club GKS Jastrzębie.

Club career

Estoril
Born in Alcabideche, Cascais, Vaz graduated from G.D. Estoril Praia's youth setup. He played his first match as a professional on 4 January 2014, coming on as a 63rd-minute substitute in a 5–1 away win against Leixões S.C. in the fifth round of the Taça de Portugal. In his maiden Primeira Liga appearance, on 1 March, he only needed six minutes on the pitch to score his first goal in the competition, converting a penalty kick in the late stages of an eventual 4–0 home defeat of S.C. Olhanense.

Reus
On 27 January 2015, Vaz terminated his contract with Estoril and moved to Spain after agreeing to a five-year deal with Segunda División B side CF Reus Deportiu. He made 27 appearances in his first full season – playoffs included – scoring three times to help the club reach Segunda División for the first time in its 117-year history.

Vaz scored his first goal in the Spanish second tier on 10 September 2016, equalising the 1–1 home draw with CD Numancia.

OFI
On 30 January 2019, OFI Crete F.C. announced the signing of Vaz on a two-and-a-half-year contract for an undisclosed fee. He scored his first Super League Greece goal on 31 March, but in a 3–1 away loss against Aris Thessaloniki FC. He repeated the feat a week later, at home to relegation rivals PAS Giannina FC (1–0).

References

External links

Portuguese League profile 

1994 births
Living people
Sportspeople from Cascais
Portuguese footballers
Association football wingers
Primeira Liga players
Liga Portugal 2 players
G.D. Estoril Praia players
S.C. Covilhã players
Segunda División players
Segunda División B players
CF Reus Deportiu players
Super League Greece players
Super League Greece 2 players

OFI Crete F.C. players
A.E. Kifisia F.C. players
GKS Jastrzębie players
Portuguese expatriate footballers
Expatriate footballers in Spain
Expatriate footballers in Greece
Expatriate footballers in Poland
Portuguese expatriate sportspeople in Spain
Portuguese expatriate sportspeople in Greece
Portuguese expatriate sportspeople in Poland